Armillaria griseomellea is a species of mushroom in the family Physalacriaceae. This species is found in South America.

See also 
 List of Armillaria species

References 

griseomellea
Fungal tree pathogens and diseases
Taxa named by Rolf Singer
Fungi of South America